Assistant was a brig of 110 tons burden, armed with four 4-pounders and eight swivel guns, and carrying a complement of twenty-seven.

She accompanied  as tender on William Bligh's second breadfruit expedition from August 1791 to August 1793.  Her commander was Lieutenant Nathaniel Portlock.

References

External links
 
 Lieutenant Nathaniel Portlock's Logbook of the Assistant, with brief biographical notes

Royal Navy ship names